Joseph Lewis Clark (January 15, 1949 – May 2, 2006) was an American murderer executed by the State of Ohio. He was the 21st person executed by Ohio since the state resumed executions in 1999. Clark was sentenced to death on November 28, 1984, for the murder of 22-year-old David Manning during a gas station hold-up in Toledo, though he also confessed to the separate murder of a convenience store employee.

Details of Clark's crime
When Clark entered a Toledo gas station at approximately 9:00 p.m. on January 13, 1984, he had his .32 caliber revolver drawn. He demanded money, and the attendant, David A. Manning, handed him the money out of the cash register. After receiving the money, Clark claimed that this was not all the money Manning had. Manning then proceeded to give him an envelope, and it was at this point that Clark shot him. Clark stole sixty dollars in the hold-up.

On January 16, 1984, Clark was arrested after allegedly committing an assault and robbery at an Ohio bank. The arresting officer found a .32 caliber revolver in Clark's coat pocket. The next day, Clark, aware that he was a suspect in the Manning murder, tried to hang himself in his jail cell. On January 23, 1984, he was released from the hospital and taken to the Toledo Police Detective Bureau, where he was read his Miranda rights and subsequently confessed to the murder of Manning after his Miranda rights were again recited to him.

Following Clark's indictment for Manning's murder, Clark challenged the voluntariness of his statement to the police, and an evidentiary hearing was held on the issue. At the suppression hearing, a psychiatrist testified on behalf of Clark. Although the psychiatrist had not examined Clark, he had reviewed the medical records from the hospitalization following Clark's suicide attempt, as well as Clark's juvenile records, various police documents, and the court's diagnostic and treatment reports. Based on a review of these records, he noted that Clark's mental function would be considered "borderline defective" based on his reported I.Q. of 75. He also concluded that Clark suffered from acute brain damage and chronic impairment of his mental functioning at the time of his confession (apparently due to Clark's recent suicide attempt). The psychiatrist testified that Clark's impaired mental condition would have interfered with his ability to make choices in an informed and reasonable manner and would have rendered him more susceptible to pressure or duress from others.

The prosecution offered in response the testimony of the officers who interrogated Clark and the testimony of Clark's attending physician, who concluded that, from a medical-neurological standpoint, Clark was capable of deciding on waiving his rights. Following the suppression hearing, the state trial court determined that Clark voluntarily and knowingly waived his right against self-incrimination. Clark's confession was subsequently introduced at trial.

Execution
The execution took nearly 90 minutes because prison officials had difficulty finding a vein.

See also 
 Capital punishment in Ohio
 Capital punishment in the United States
 List of people executed in Ohio
 List of people executed in the United States in 2006

Sources

General references
 Clark Prosecutor
 Clark v. Mitchell, 425 F.3d 270
 State v. Clark, 1998 Ohio App. LEXIS 3688
 State v. Clark, 1986 Ohio App. LEXIS 9408
 Execution of Joseph Lewis Clark fails to go smoothly, Copley News Service, May 2, 2006
 Erica Ryan. Botched execution fires up opponents of death penalty. The Columbus Dispatch (2006-05-04). Retrieved on 2007-11-05.
 Jim Provance and Christina Hall. Clark execution raises lethal-injection issues. The Blade – Toledo, Ohio (2006-05-04). Retrieved on 2007-11-05.

1949 births
2006 deaths
21st-century executions by Ohio
American people executed for murder
Executed African-American people
People convicted of murder by Ohio
21st-century executions of American people
People executed by Ohio by lethal injection
People from Toledo, Ohio
Executed people from Ohio
21st-century African-American people